Stuart Franklin (born 16 June 1956) is a British photographer. He is a member of Magnum Photos and was its President from 2006 to 2009.

Early life and education
Franklin was born on 16 June 1956 at Guys Hospital in London. He studied drawing under Leonard McComb in Oxford and Whitechapel, London, and from 1976 to 1979 photography at West Surrey College of Art and Design, where he graduated with a BA. Moreover, between 1995 and 1997, he studied geography at the University of Oxford, first receiving a BA and the Gibbs Prize for geography. He received a doctorate in Geography from the University of Oxford in 2000. Franklin was awarded a professorship in documentary photography in 2016. He taught photography and visual storytelling at Volda University College, Norway until July 2021. He is currently an affiliate professor at the University of Malta.

Career
From 1980 until 1985, Franklin worked with Sygma in Paris. During that time he photographed the civil war in Lebanon, unemployment in Britain, famine in Sudan and the Heysel Stadium disaster.

Joining Magnum Photos in 1985, he became a full member in 1989. In the same year, Franklin photographed the uprising in Tiananmen Square and shot one of the Tank Man photographs, first published in Time magazine, as well as widely documenting the uprising in Beijing earning him a World Press Photo Award.

In 1989 Franklin traveled with Greenpeace to Antarctica. He worked on about twenty stories for National Geographic between 1991 and 2009, subjects including Inca conqueror Francisco Pizarro and the hydro-struggle in Quebec and places such as Buenos Aires and Malaysia. In addition, he worked on book and cultural projects. In October 2008, his book Footprint: Our Landscape in Flux was published by Thames & Hudson. An ominous photographic document of Europe’s changing landscape, it highlights Franklin's ecological concern.

During 2009 Franklin curated an exhibition on Gaza - Point of No Return for the Noorderlicht Photo Festival. Since 2009 he has focused on a long term landscape project in Norway published as Narcissus in 2013. More recently he has worked on documentary projects on doctors working in Syria, and immigration in Calais. Franklin's most recent book, The Documentary Impulse was published by Phaidon in April 2016. It investigates the nature of truth in reporting and the drive towards self-representation beginning 50,000 years ago with cave art through to the various iterations and impulses that have guided documentary photography along its differing tracks for nearly 200 years. Franklin was the general chair of the World Press Photo jury 2017. Franklin is currently working on a long term photographic essay in Malta and Southern Europe.

Awards
 Christian Aid Award for Humanitarian Photography, 1985
 Tom Hopkinson Award, 1987
 Third prize stories, Spot News, World Press Photo Award, 1990
 Pictures of the Year International Award, 1990
 Gibbs Prize for geography, University of Oxford, 1997
 Honorary Fellowship of the Royal Photographic Society, 2003
 Feature of the Year, Medical Journalists' Association, 2021. Cover story on coronavirus in a London hospital for The Sunday Times magazine: Eye of the Storm.

Books
Tiananmen Square. London: Black Sun, 1989.
The Time of Trees. Milan: Leonardo Arte, 1999. .
Alberi / Trees. Milan: Fondazione Nicola Trussardi / Charta, 2002. .
La Città Dinamica. Milan: Mondadori Electa, 2003. .
Sea Fever. Oxford: Bardwell, 2005. .
Hotel Afrique. Stockport: Dewi Lewis, 2007. 
Footprint: Our Landscape in Flux. London: Thames & Hudson, 2008. .
St Petersburg. St Petersburg: Perlov Design Center, 2012. 
Narcissus. Ostfildern: Hatje Cantz, 2013. 
 The Documentary Impulse. New York and London: Phaidon, 2016. 
Analogies. Berlin: Hatje Cantz, 2019. 
Ambiguity Revisited: Communicating with pictures. Hanover: Ibidem Verlag. 2020.

References

External links 
Personal Web site
Interview for Italian Photography Magazine Maledetti Fotografi.
Interview about his photograph of a man in front of tanks at Tiananmen Square, 1989.
Tiananmen Square photo and description

1956 births
Living people
English photojournalists
Writers from London
Magnum photographers